Stenidea densevestita is a species of beetle in the family Cerambycidae. It was described by Fairmaire in 1890. It is known from Djibouti, Somalia, Kenya and Tanzania. It contains the varietas Stenidea densevestita var. fuscoplagiata.

References

densevestita
Beetles described in 1890